Hatata (Ge'ez: ሐተታ ḥätäta "inquiry") is a Ge'ez term describing an investigation. The hatatas are two 17th century ethical and rational philosophical treatises from present-day Ethiopia: One hatata is written by the Abyssinian philosopher Zera Yacob (Zär'a Ya'eqob, also named Wärqe, 1599 – 1692), supposedly in 1667. The other hatata is written by his patron's son, Walda Heywat (Wäldä Hewat) some years later. Especially Zera Yacob's inquiry has been compared by scholars to Descartes'. While Zera Yacob was critical towards all religions, including the Ethiopian Orthodox Tewahedo Church, Descartes followed a more traditional religious perspective: "A major philosophical difference is that the Catholic Descartes explicitly denounced ‘infidels’ and atheists, whom he called 'more arrogant than learned' in his Meditations on First Philosophy (1641)."

Overview
The hatatas became accessible in 1904, when the Italian scholar Enno Littmann published the original texts in Ge'ez in addition to a Latin translation. The texts were first rediscovered by Boris Turayev in the archives of the collector Antoine D'Abbadie, who had received the hatatas from the Jesuit monk Guisto da Urbino in 1853. The texts were given to France's National Library in Paris in 1902, after D'Abbadie's death, and Turayev translated the first extracts in December 1903 (St. Petersburg). The Oriental Section of the Archeological Society held a meeting in Paris, on 25 September 1903, dedicated to Turayev's report on the hatatas.

Littmann presented a German translation in 1916. An abridged translation in English, of Zera Yacob's inquiry only, appeared in New Times and Ethiopia News (London) from 5 February until 4 March 1944. In 1955, Zamanfas Kidus Abreha published both an Ethiopic version (based on Littmann) and an Amharic translation. In 1965, Lino Marchiotto presented his doctoral thesis on the hatatas, and he included an Italian translation based on Littmann's Latin version. A breakthrough came in 1976, when the Canadian born scholar Claude Sumner - Professor and Chairman of the Department of Philosophy at the Addis Ababa University - published the first complete English translation (it was published in Ethiopia, and it was based on his translations in Ekklastikos Pharos in 1971/1974). Sumner states on the inquiry by Zera Yacob: "Being in possession of one basic principle, the author extends its application to the various branches of knowledge, and in particular, to theodicy, to ethics, and to psychology. (...) It exhibits not only independence of thought, but even rationalistic and radical traits (...) Zär'a Ya'eqob is a real philosopher in the strictest sense of the word." In 2016, the two texts were translated from Ge'ez to Norwegian, by the scholar Reidulf Molvær, and published in Norwegian by a renowned publisher.

According to the first hatata, Zera Yacob developed his thinking as an investigation of the light of reason after he had to flee his hometown of Aksum in ca. 1630, because of the persecution by the Portuguese Jesuits and the Ethiopian Emperor Susenyos I, who had converted from Ethiopian Orthodox Christianity to Catholicism in 1622. According to Zera Yacob's own text, he lived in a cave for two years, while he wrote the text down more than thirty years later, in 1667.

Zera Yacob is most noted for this philosophy surrounding the principle of harmony. He asserted that an action's morality is decided by whether it advances or degrades overall harmony in the world. While he did believe in a deity, whom he referred to as God, he criticised several sets of religious beliefs. Rather than deriving beliefs from any organized religion, Yacob sought the truth in observing the natural world. In Hatata, Zera Yacob applied the idea of a first cause to produce a proof for the existence of God, thus proposing a cosmological argument. "If I say that my father and my mother created me, then I must search for the creator of my parents and of the parents of my parents until they arrive at the first who were not created as we [are] but who came into this world in some other way without being generated." However, the knowability of God does not depend on human intellect, but "Our soul has the power of having the concept of God and of seeing him mentally. God did not give this power purposelessly; as he gave the power, so did he give the reality."

After he left his cave, as peace was restored in Ethiopia, Zera Yacob proposed to a poor maiden named Hirut. In his inquiry he states that "husband and wife are equal in marriage". Hence, the global historian of ideas Dag Herbjørnsrud writes: "In chapter five, Yacob applies rational investigation to the different religious laws. He criticises Christianity, Islam, Judaism and Indian religions equally. For example, Yacob points out that the Creator in His wisdom has made blood flow monthly from the womb of women, in order for them to bear children. Thus, he concludes that the law of Moses, which states that menstruating women are impure, is against nature and the Creator, since it ‘impedes marriage and the entire life of a woman, and it spoils the law of mutual help, prevents the bringing up of children and destroys love’.In this way, Yacob includes the perspectives of solidarity, women and affection in his philosophical argument."

Upon Yacob's death in 1692 his pupil Walda Heywat updated the work to include his death, in addition to writing his own hatata. Heywat's inquiry has been described as more traditional.

Controversy over authorship

In 1920, the Italian Orientalist Carlo Conti Rossini asserted that the hatata texts were written by the Italian priest Guisto de Urbino himself. Rossini got support for his theory in 1934, when the German Eugen Mittwoch, also argued that the philosophical hatata texts could not have been written by an African. In his works of 1976, Sumner published a lengthy rebuttal of Rossini's and Mittwoch's claims. In the paper "Italian scientists and the war in Ethiopia" (2015), Professor Roberto Maiocchi points out that Rossini were among the most important scholars supporting Italy's invasion of Ethiopia in 1935: "(...) Carlo Conti-Rossini, Italy’s main expert in Ethiopian literature, published an article in September 1935, a few days before the beginning of the conflict: using arguments that could apply to any African country, he stated that Abissinia was incapable of evolution and civil progress, and therefore its conquest was justified." After the conquest of Ethiopia, Rossini received a prize from the Mussolini regime in 1937. Mittwoch, who had Jewish background, kept his position in Nazi Germany until December 1935, after the outbreak of the Italio-Ethiopian war, because of a special intervention by Mussolini with Hitler on behalf of Mittwoch, as Mussolini "saw Mittwoch as a potential asset for Italy's colonization of Ethiopia."

Rossini argued that the Franciscan Jesuit monk da Urbino did not send the original manuscripts to the collector D'Abbadie, but instead sent "copies" he had made by his own hand. Rossini also claimed that a monk, Tekle Haymanot, had heard other people say that Urbino might have written the treatise in cooperation with other Geez scholars in Ethiopia. This "fraud theory" also claims that there was an anticipated place in D'Abbadie's then growing collection of Ethiopia literature for "scientific" and other rare subjects to be placed in, and that D'Urbino was able to deliver and satisfy this need of his financial sponsor. A scholar who presently has subscribed to the theory of Rossini, is Anaïs Wion, a prominent French scholar of Ethiopic Literature.

Those who hold it to be rather impossible that an Italian priest, with a couple of years training in Ge'ez, could have written both the texts of Zera Yacob and Walda Heywat, two rather different texts supposedly from the 17th century, while he visited Ethiopia, include the Canadian Professor Claude Sumner, the American scholar and philosopher Teodros Kiros, and several others. In 2017, the senior and foremost Professor within Ge'ez studies today, Getatchew Haile (1931–2021), published a book with a chapter on his new views upon the hatatas, as he had for a long time rejected the authenticity of the hatatas. Inspired by a 2007 thesis, written by Luam Tesfalidet, and after reading Wion's articles, he writes, under the headline Sources: "(...) I am now firmly inclined to believe that the original Hatata is the work of an Ethiopian debtera who lived, as he claimed, during the era of the Catholics (reign of Emperor Susenyos, 1607-32)."

His conclusion: "The Jesuits worked hard to convert Ethiopians to Catholicism and had some significant successes. They succeeded in converting Emperors Za Dengel (1603-04) and Susenyos (1607-32) and many priests and monks, including the leadership of Debre Libanos. They influenced the thinking of many who then questioned the traditions of their Ethiopian Orthodox Church. Accordingly, it makes more sense to suspect the influence of Catholic teaching on the thinking of Zera Yacob than to ascribe his Hatata to da Urbino."

References

Further reading

 .
 .
 .
 .
 .
 . Contains the Ge'ez text of the Hatata.
 .
 .
 . Contains an English translation of, and brief introduction to, the Hatata and three other texts.
 .
 .
 .

External links and sources
 
"In You I Take Shelter: Zera Yacob": Podcast by Peter Adamson and Chike Jeffers. 
A Brief Guide to the Hatätas (links to different translations)
 Ethiopian Philosophy – A blog with commentary on the Hatata
Encyclopaedia Aethiopica: D-Ha. Otto Harrassowitz Verlag. 2003, p. 1046.

Ethiopian literature
Ethics books
Philosophy of religion literature
1667 books

he:זרע יעקב (פילוסוף)#הטטה